Amnet may refer to:
 A subsidiary of Amcom Telecommunications based and operating in Perth, Western Australia
 A subsidiary of Millicom, a telecommunications company based in Luxembourg and operating internationally